Edward T. P. Graham (1872–1964) was an American architect best known for his design of Roman Catholic churches in Boston, Massachusetts and throughout the Midwest.

Early life 

Described at his death as "the dean of Boston architects", Mr. Graham was born in Cambridge, Massachusetts on February 2, 1872, the son of Thomas Augustus Graham and Helena (Kenny) Graham.

He attended Cambridge High School and Harvard University, where he received an S.B. degree in 1900, and Boston College where he received a master's degree in 1915.

European travels and associations 

In 1901 Graham received the first Austin Traveling Fellowship under which he traveled and studied in Europe for the next two years. Then he worked for one year with Peabody and Stearns of Boston before opening an office of his own there, with an office later also in Cleveland, Ohio where he was associated with the firm of F. Stillman Fish. He made his home first in Brookline and then, for the last forty-five years of his life, at 67 Oxford Street, Cambridge.

Legacy 

During his long career he designed many schools, hospitals, churches, and public buildings for states and cities in New England and the Midwest. Among them were in Boston: The Forsyth Dental Infirmary, City Hall Annex, two buildings of the City Hospital, the Registry of Motor Vehicles; in Cambridge, the Church of St. Paul, and five buildings for St. Elizabeth Hospital, Brighton. In Harvard's Twenty-fifth Anniversary Report he wrote, "As to style in architecture, I believe that the free mediaeval styles offer the best field for further development of architecture in any country, our own included. There is formalism in the Renaissance and all since attempted in its manner, which is crippling, and restricting. Structure, dressed in transparent rather than opaque robes, is what should be followed in building."

Death 

Graham continued in his practice as an architect until a short time before his death, in Boston on September 3, 1964.

Notable works 

Church of the Holy Name, West Roxbury, MA
Our Lady Of Lourdes Church, Jamaica Plain, MA
St. John Church, Winthrop, MA
St. Paul Church, Cambridge, Massachusetts
Mary Immaculate of Lourdes Church, Newton, MA
St. Philip Neri Church, Newton, MA (demolished 2017)
St. Joseph Church, Quincy, MA
St. Anthony Church, Revere, MA
St. Anthony's-by-the-Sea, Gloucester, MA
St. James Church Medford, MA
Holy Rosary Church, Lawrence, MA
Sacred Heart Church,  Lexington, MA
St. Paul Church, Hamilton, MA
Holy Ghost Church, Whitman, MA
St. Coleman Church, Brockton, MA
St Margaret Church, Burlington, MA (Graham's last church)
St. Mary Church, Akron, OH
St. Joseph Church, Canton, OH
St. Ignatius of Antioch Church, Cleveland, OH (with F. Stillman Fish)
St. James Church, Cleveland, OH
St. Cyril and Methdius Church, Lakewood, OH
Our Lady of Peace Church, Cleveland, OH
St. Patrick Church, Youngstown, OH
Church of the Annunciation, Cincinnati, OH
St. Malachy Church, Near West Side neighborhood, Chicago, IL
St. Agnes Parish Center, Chicago, IL 
Chapel, St John Preparatory School, Danvers, MA
Boy's Latin School, Cleveland, Ohio
St. Mary's Church (Dedham, Massachusetts) rectory
St. Mary's Church and Convent (1907), Cambridge,MA

Buildings by Edward T. P Graham

References

Shand Tucci, Douglas (1978). Built In Boston: City and Suburb, 1800-1950, Boston: New York Graphic Society. , page 146, 148, 177, 196

External links
St. Paul Parish (Cambridge, Massachusetts)  website
Edward T. P. Graham papers at Burns Library, Boston College
Historic photographs of Grahm's work at St. Elizabeth Hospital, Brighton MA
Boston MFA's newly acquired Forsyth Institute Building

1872 births
1964 deaths
Architects from Boston
Architects from Cambridge, Massachusetts
Harvard University alumni
Boston College alumni
Architects of Roman Catholic churches